Jordyn Pedersen (born 26 November 1997) is a retired Canadian artistic gymnast.

Biography
She was born on 26 November 1997 in Mississauga, Ontario, to Randy and Melody Pedersen. In 2008 she joined the University of Georgia. In 2014 she participated to the World Artistic Gymnastics Championships in Nanning, China, where she placed 12th with Canada in the team competition.

She suffered from shoulder pain throughout her sophomore year, taking medicines to control it. The injury eventually led to her retirement. After her retirement she served as a student assistant coach.

References

1997 births
Living people
Canadian female artistic gymnasts
Georgia Gym Dogs gymnasts
Sportspeople from Mississauga
20th-century Canadian women
21st-century Canadian women